Kitzis, Kitzes may refer to:

 Eyal Kitzis, Israeli actor
 Ze'ev Wolf Kitzes, hasidic rabbi

See also
 Edward "Eddy" Lawrence Kitsis, American screenwriter and television producer

Jewish surnames